Hooker may refer to:

People
 Hooker (surname)

Places

Antarctica
 Mount Hooker (Antarctica)
 Cape Hooker (Antarctica)
 Cape Hooker (South Shetland Islands)

New Zealand
 Hooker River
 Mount Hooker (New Zealand) in the Southern Alps 
 Hooker Glacier (New Zealand), in the Southern Alps

United States
 Hooker, California, an unincorporated community
 Hooker, Georgia, an unincorporated community
 Little Goose Creek (Kentucky), location of Hooker post office and river branch
 Hooker, Missouri, a ghost town
 Hooker, Ohio, an unincorporated community
 Hooker, Oklahoma, a city
 Hooker, South Dakota, an unincorporated community
 Hooker County, Nebraska
 Hooker Township, Dixon County, Nebraska
 Hooker Township, Gage County, Nebraska
 Hooker Dam, a proposed dam on the Gila River in New Mexico
 Hooker Falls, North Carolina
 Mount Hooker (Wyoming)

Elsewhere
 Mount Hooker (Canada), a mountain on the Continental Divide and border between British Columbia and Alberta, Canada
 Hooker and Brown, mythical mountains alleged to exist in the Canadian Rockies
 Hooker Island, Franz Josef Land, Russia

In sport
 Hooker (rugby league), one of the positions in rugby league football
 Hooker, one of the positions in rugby union football
 In cricket, a batsman who plays the hook shot
 An expert practitioner of catch wrestling 
 Hooker, book by Lou Thesz on professional wrestling
 A boxer who is particularly known for throwing hooks

Other uses 
 Prostitute, colloquially called a "hooker"
 Galway hooker, a traditional Irish fishing boat
 Hooker Telescope, a 100-inch telescope  at Mount Wilson Observatory
 Hooker Emerald, a  emerald owned by the Smithsonian Institution
 The title character of T. J. Hooker, an American police drama television program, played by William Shatner
 "Hooker", a song by Pink from the album Try This
 Hooker's Green, a particular mixture of green and blue

See also
Hooker Creek (disambiguation)